The 1977 Miami Redskins football team was an American football team that represented Miami University during the 1977 NCAA Division I football season. In their fourth season under head coach Dick Crum, the Redskins tied for the Mid-American Conference (MAC) championship, compiled a 10–1 record (5–0 against MAC opponents) and outscored all opponents by a combined total of 262 to 173.  The team's sole loss came against South Carolina by a 42–19 score in the second week of the season.

The team's statistical leaders included Larry Fortner with 1,473 passing yards, Mark Hunter with 809 rushing yards, and Paul Warth with 540 receiving yards.

Schedule

Roster

References

Miami
Miami RedHawks football seasons
Mid-American Conference football champion seasons
Miami Redskins football